Allison Pauline Peter (born July 14, 1992) is a Virgin Islands sprinter. At the 2012 Summer Olympics, she competed in the Women's 100 metres and the Women's 200 metres.

Personal bests

Achievements

References

External links

Tilastopaja biography

1992 births
Living people
People from Saint Croix, U.S. Virgin Islands
United States Virgin Islands female sprinters
Olympic track and field athletes of the United States Virgin Islands
Athletes (track and field) at the 2012 Summer Olympics
Athletes (track and field) at the 2015 Pan American Games
Central American and Caribbean Games bronze medalists for the United States Virgin Islands
Competitors at the 2014 Central American and Caribbean Games
Central American and Caribbean Games medalists in athletics
Pan American Games competitors for the United States Virgin Islands
Olympic female sprinters
21st-century American women